Events in the year 2018 in Greece.

Incumbents
President: Prokopis Pavlopoulos
Prime Minister: Alexis Tsipras

Events
 12 June - The government announces an agreement with the Republic of Macedonia over the Macedonia naming dispute. 
 15 June - At Lake Prespa the agreement with Macedonia to rename the country "North Macedonia" is signed by the Prime ministers of both states.
 

 23–26 July - A series of wildfires in Attica lead to the death of dozens of people (100 confirmed deaths as of December). Alexis Tsipras declares three days of national mourning.
 

 13 October - At least 11 people die after their vehicle and a lorry collide head-on in Thessaloniki, Greece.

Deaths

21 May – Vasilis Triantafillidis, comedian (b. 1940)

References

 
Greece
Greece
2010s in Greece
Years of the 21st century in Greece